Gari Kouh Tower (Borj-e-Gari-Kouh)} is a castle-like tower located in Kouhij village in Central District of Bastak County in west of Hormozgan Province, Iran. The tower is cited in west of Bastak as far as 40 kilometers. Height of the building is 915 cm.

References 
 29 September 2014 iranstan.com

Castles in Iran
Buildings and structures in Hormozgan Province
National works of Iran